Adriana Campos (February 27, 1979 – November 3, 2015), was a Colombian television, film and stage actress. She worked with RCN Televisión and Caracol Televisión as an actress of telenovelas.

Death 
Campos died on 3 November 2015, when her husband, businessman Carlos Rincón, lost control of the vehicle he was driving and it went into the Río Cauca in Peñalisa. within the jurisdiction of the municipality of Salgar near Bolombolo, southwest of the Department of Antioquia. The bodies of the victims were buried in the municipality of Salgar.

Filmography

References

External links 

1979 births
2015 deaths
Colombian telenovela actresses
Colombian film actresses
Colombian stage actresses
Colombian television actresses
21st-century Colombian actresses
Road incident deaths in Colombia
People from Chaparral, Tolima